"We're All to Blame" is a song by Canadian rock band Sum 41. It was released to radio on August 31, 2004, as the first single from Chuck.

Content
Frontman Deryck Whibley said the song is about war, death, fear, corporate power and other concerns, and was written after the band's trip to the Congo, making it the last song written for Chuck.

Music video
The video, directed by Marc Klasfeld, is a spoof of Solid Gold and features the Solid Gold dancers. At the end of the video, the announcer says that the next guest is Pain For Pleasure, Sum 41's heavy metal alter ego band.

Reception

Fox83 of Sputnikmusic called the song an "impressive approach lyrically" and said "If System of a Down's 'Chop Suey!' had never been released then this could be leaning on originality. Aside from these irritations, 'We're All to Blame' is a great effort, and deserves its place on Chuck."

An Entertainment Weekly reviewer wrote, "It may sound heinous on paper, but trust us, the first single, 'We're All To Blame', is far better than it has a right to be."

IGN published a recommendation saying, "'We're All To Blame' is, bar none, the single best song Sum 41 has ever written and performed. A hard-hitting metal ballad that comments on global greed and its horrible consequences, the song not only stands out on Chuck but it stands out as the high point of Sum 41's entire catalogue."

In popular media
"We're All to Blame" was used in Toho's Godzilla: Final Wars (2004) during a brief scene where Godzilla destroys Zilla in Sydney.

Track listing
We're All to Blame
Noots

Charts

References

Bibliography

External links

2004 singles
Thrash metal songs
Music videos directed by Marc Klasfeld
Sum 41 songs
Anti-war songs
Protest songs
2004 songs
Island Records singles
Songs written by Deryck Whibley
Songs written by Steve Jocz
Songs written by Greig Nori
Heavy metal songs